The 2011 Texas A&M Aggies football team represented Texas A&M University in the 2011 NCAA Division I FBS football season. The Aggies were led by fourth year head coach Mike Sherman during the regular season and Tim DeRuyter during their bowl game.  They played their home games at Kyle Field. This was their final football season as a member of the Big 12 Conference. They finished the season 7–6, 4–5 in Big 12 play to finish in a tie for sixth place. They were invited to the Meineke Car Care Bowl of Texas where they defeated Northwestern 33–22.

Texas A&M sold out every home game during the season for the first time, setting new attendance records for total fans (610,283) and average fans per game (87,183) in the process.  The sellouts were due in large part to speculation (later confirmed) that Texas A&M would become a member of the Southeastern Conference beginning in 2012.

A week after losing the rivalry game with Texas, on December 1, 2011, head coach Mike Sherman was fired by phone while on a recruiting trip in Houston, Texas. Defensive coordinator Tim DeRuyter was the interim head coach for their bowl game. Sherman finished at A&M with a four-year record of 25–25. Sherman was replaced by Kevin Sumlin while DeRuyter left A&M to become the head coach at Fresno State.

Schedule

Personnel

Roster

Rankings

References

Texas AandM
Texas A&M Aggies football seasons
Texas Bowl champion seasons
Texas AandM Aggies football